Professional fraternities, in the North American fraternity system, are organizations whose primary purpose is to promote the interests of a particular profession and whose membership is restricted to students in that particular field of professional education or study.  This may be contrasted with service fraternities and sororities, whose primary purpose is community service, and social fraternities and sororities, whose primary purposes are generally aimed towards some other aspect, such as the development of character, friendship, leadership, or literary ability.

Professional fraternities are often confused with honor societies because of their focus on a specific discipline.  Professional fraternities are actually significantly different from honor societies in that honor societies are associations designed to provide recognition of the past achievement of those who are invited to membership.  Honor society membership, in most cases, requires no period of pledging, and new candidates may be immediately inducted into membership after meeting predetermined academic criteria and paying a one-time membership fee.  Because of their purpose of recognition, most honor societies will have much higher academic achievement requirements for membership.

Professional fraternities, on the other hand, work to build brotherhood among members and cultivate the strengths of members in order to promote their profession and to provide assistance to one another in their mutual areas of professional study.  Membership in a professional fraternity may be the result of a pledge process, much like a social fraternity, and members are expected to remain loyal and active in the organization for life.  Within their professional field of study, their membership is exclusive; however, they may initiate members who belong to other types of fraternities.

History
The first professional fraternity was founded at Transylvania University in Lexington, Kentucky in 1819: the Kappa Lambda Society of Aesculapius, established for the purpose of bringing together students of the medical profession.  The fraternity lasted until about 1858.

Of the professional fraternities still in existence, the oldest is Phi Delta Phi founded at the University of Michigan in 1869; however, Phi Delta Phi changed its mission in 2012 to become an honor society for law school students.

Title IX applied to professional fraternities
In the United States fraternity system, professional fraternities are usually co-educational in accord with Federal Title IX of the Education Amendments of 1972 (commonly referred to as "Title IX"). This federal law discourages discrimination on the basis of sex in any college or university receiving federal financial assistance. However, the membership practices of social fraternities and sororities are exempt from Title IX in section (A)(6)(a). The U.S. Department of Education (DOE) regulations adopted pursuant to Title IX also allow such an exception for "the membership practices of social fraternities and sororities." (34 C.F.R. Sec. 106.14(a)).

Prior to Title IX, many professional fraternities were all male and most professional sororities/women's fraternities were all female. Several of these professional fraternities and sororities even considered themselves both professional and social organizations because they often emphasized the social aspects of their activities. During the ensuing years since the enactment of Title IX, single-sex professional fraternities and sororities became coeducational to conform to Title IX. Several organizations simply opened their membership both men and women. For example, Phi Chi (medicine) opened membership to women in 1973; Phi Beta (music and speech) opened membership to men in 1976; and Delta Omicron (music) opened membership to men in 1979. A few single-sex groups merged with other organizations, such as Phi Delta Delta, a women's professional law fraternity, merged with Phi Alpha Delta (law) in 1972.

Despite the fact that Title IX was enacted in 1972, there continues to be professional fraternities and sororities or their chapters that have not become coeducational and therefore, do not conform to Title IX. Generally, these groups still claim to be both professional and social organizations, for instance, Alpha Gamma Rho (men in agriculture), Alpha Omega Epsilon (women in engineering), and Sigma Phi Delta (men in engineering).

Several social fraternities and sororities have membership practices of selecting their members primarily from students enrolled in particular majors or areas of study, including Phi Mu Alpha Sinfonia, Phi Sigma Rho, and Triangle. Nevertheless, these groups are social, rather than professional, organizations. Although they select members from students in a particular field of study, like a professional fraternity, they are single-sex social organizations because their purposes focus only on the social development of their members. Examples of groups that have been officially granted exemption from Title IX by the DOE to remain single-sex include Sigma Alpha Iota in 1981  and Phi Mu Alpha Sinfonia in 1983.

Umbrella organizations
Many professional fraternities, particularly those of the highest esteem and reputation, are members of the Professional Fraternity Association (PFA). This group resulted in 1978 from a merger of the Professional Interfraternity Conference (PIC) (for men's group) and the Professional Panhellenic Association (PPA) (for women's groups).  In 2013, faced with an increase in campus policies that require student organizations to take all students, the PFA adopted a resolution against All Comers policies.

List of professional fraternities

Arts, literature, and media

Agriculture

Business and economics

Education

Engineering, architecture,  math, and science

Law

Medicine

Military, government, and foreign service

Music

Pharmaceutical and pharmacological

Other

Notes

Reference

External links 
 Professional Fraternity Association webpage

 
Fraternities, Professional